Pszczynka is a river in Silesian Voivodeship of Poland, a left tributary of the Vistula, 45.26 km long.

The sources of the river are located in Wodzisław County (near Gogołowa) and Jastrzębie-Zdrój. It flows through Pszczyna. On the river, there is Łąka retention reservoir. Its tributaries include Dokawa and Korzeniec.

Gallery

See also
 List of rivers of Poland

References

Vistula basin
Rivers of Poland
Pszczyna